An ounce is any of several units of mass

Ounce may also be:
 Ounce-force, a unit of force, one sixteenth of a pound-force
 Fluid ounce, any of several units of volume
 Ounce, alternative name for the snow leopard
 Ounce, in heraldry the same feline as the leopard (heraldry)
 Ounce (roman coin)

See also
 Troy ounce